

France
 French Somaliland – 
 Jacques Marie Julien Compain, Governor of French Somaliland (1958–1962)
 René Tirant, Governor of French Somaliland (1962–1966)

Portugal
 Angola – 
 Verâncio Augusto Deslandes, High Commissioner of Angola (1961–1962)
 Silvino Silvério Marquês, High Commissioner of Angola (1962–1966)

United Kingdom
 Aden – Sir Charles Johnston, Governor of Aden (1960–1963)
 Malta Colony –  
 Sir Guy Grantham, Governor of Malta (1959–1962)
 Sir Maurice Henry Dorman, Governor of Malta (1962–1964)
 Northern Rhodesia – Sir Evelyn Dennison Hone, Governor of Northern Rhodesia (1959–1964)

Colonial governors
Colonial governors
1962